Mario Fontanella (born 28 June 1989) is an Italian footballer who plays as a forward for Al-Muharraq in the Bahraini Premier League.

Club career

Italy 

Born and raised in Naples, Mario began his professional footballing career in 2008 with Barletta-based A.S.D. Barletta 1922 making five appearances in the 2008–09 Lega Pro Seconda Divisione. He then moved to Serie D side Pol. Viribus Unitis where he scored four goals in 14 appearances for his side in the remaining of the 2008–09 Serie D season.

He then moved to Mugnano di Napoli where he signed a two-year contract with Neapolis. He scored 16 goals in 32 appearances in the 2009–10 Serie D helping his side earn promotion to the Lega Pro Seconda Divisione. In the 2010–11 Lega Pro Seconda Divisione season, the Italian striker failed to score any goal in 15 appearances.

In 2011, he moved to Noto where he signed a two-year contract with Serie D side, Noto Calcio and scored 16 goals in 31 appearances in the 2011–12 Serie D.

Later in 2013, he moved to Sarno where he signed a short-term contract with another Serie D side, A.S.D. Pol. Sarnese Calcio.

He then moved to Bastia Umbra where he signed a one-year contract with A.C. Bastia 1924. He scored 13 goals in 30 appearances in the 2013–14 Serie D.

His most remarkable season in Italy was with Budoni-based, A.S.D. Pol. Calcio Budoni where he scored 27 goals in 30 appearances in the 2014–15 Serie D and was awarded the top scorer award for the season.

Malta 

He first moved out of Italy in 2015 to the neighboring Malta where he signed a long term contract with Maltese Premier League side, Floriana. He made his official debut for the club on 22 August 2015 in a 2–1 defeat against Mosta and scored his first goal on 12 September 2015 in a 3–0 win over Qormi He made his Maltese FA Trophy debut on 20 January 2016 in a 2–1 win over Lija Athletic F.C. He finished the 2015–16 Maltese Premier League season with 20 goals in 31 appearances.

He made his first appearance in the 2016–17 Maltese Premier League and scored his first goal in the competition on 20 August 2016 in a 2-1 win over Pembroke Athleta F.C. He made his first appearance and scored his first goal in the 2016–17 Maltese FA Trophy on 18 January 2017 in a 4-1 win over Għajnsielem F.C. He scored 14 goals in 29 appearances in the 2016–17 Maltese Premier League and scored 2 goals in 4 appearances in the Maltese FA Trophy helping his side win the prestigious competition for that season.

His performances in the Maltese Premier League also saw him briefly linked to English National League side F.C. Halifax Town during the summer of 2017, though stayed put with Floriana for another season.

He also made his UEFA Europa League debut on 29 June 2017 in a 3-0 loss against Serbian giants, Red Star Belgrade.

Following the end of his contract, on 13 May 2018, he joined cross-town rivals Valletta, signing a three-year contract.

Honours
Floriana
 Maltese FA Trophy: 2016–17
 Maltese Super Cup: 2017
 Top Scorer Maltese Premier League: 2015–16

Valletta
 Maltese Premier League: 2018–19
 Maltese Super Cup: 2018
 Maltese Super Cup: 2019

References

External link

1989 births
Living people
Footballers from Naples
Italian footballers
Italian expatriate footballers
Association football forwards
Floriana F.C. players
Valletta F.C. players
Maltese Premier League players
Expatriate footballers in Malta
Italian expatriate sportspeople in Malta